The women's trampoline competition at the 2020 Summer Olympics took place on 30 July 2021 at the Ariake Gymnastics Centre.

The medals for the competition were presented by Tricia Smith, IOC Member, Olympian, and Silver Medalist, Canada; and the medalists' bouquets were presented by Luo Chaoyi, FIG Executive Committee Member; People's Republic of China.

Schedule
All times are in Japan Standard Time (UTC+9)

Results

Qualification
Qualification rules: the top eight gymnasts with the highest total scores (1st routine + 2nd routine) qualify for the final.

 = Reserve 1
 = Reserve 2

Final

References

trampoline
2020
Olympics
Women's events at the 2020 Summer Olympics